The 2014–15 Biathlon World Cup – World Cup 4 was held in Oberhof, Germany, from 7 January until 11 January 2015.

Schedule of events

Medal winners

Men

Women

Achievements

 Best performance for all time

 , 10th place in Sprint
 , 11th place in Sprint
 , 18th place in Sprint
 , 28th place in Sprint
 , 62nd place in Sprint
 , 75th place in Sprint
 , 99th place in Sprint
 , 4th place in Mass Start
 , 1st place in Sprint
 , 3rd place in Sprint
 , 5th place in Mass Start
 , 28th place in Sprint
 , 30th place in Sprint
 , 63rd place in Sprint

 First World Cup race

 , 48th place in Sprint
 , 59th place in Sprint
 , 68th place in Sprint
 , 82nd place in Sprint
 , 85th place in Sprint
 , 87th place in Sprint

References 

4
2015 in German sport
January 2015 sports events in Germany
World Cup - World Cup 4,2014-15
Sport in Oberhof, Germany
2014-15 Biathlon World Cup – World Cup 4
Sport in Thuringia